Leadbeater is a surname. Notable people with the surname include:
Anne Leadbeater, Australian trauma recovery specialist
 Barrie Leadbeater (born 1943), English first-class cricketer and umpire
 Benjamin Leadbeater (1760–1837), British naturalist
 Charles Leadbeater, English author
 Charles Webster Leadbeater (1854–1934), English clergyman, theosophist and author
 Eddie Leadbeater (1927–2011), former English cricketer
 Elli Leadbeater, British ecologist and evolutionary biologist
 Harry Leadbeater (1863–1928), English amateur first-class cricketer
 James Leadbeater (born 1989), Welsh rugby union player
 Jo Leadbeater (1974-2016), married name Jo Cox, assassinated British politician, sister of Kim
Kim Leadbeater (born 1976), British politician, sister of Jo
 Maire Leadbeater (born 1940s), New Zealand human rights and peace activist, writer, and former social worker
 Mary Leadbeater (1758–1826), Irish author

See also 
Leadbeater's (disambiguation)
Leadbetter (disambiguation)
Ledbetter (disambiguation)